Beata Leppilampi (née Papp (born 22 April 1995) is a Finnish former competitive figure skater. She placed 15th at the 2010 World Junior Championships and won two medals at the Finnish Championships.

Personal life
Beata Papp was born on 22 April 1995 in Kuopio, Finland and moved to Canada in the summer of 2007. She is the daughter of a figure skating coach, Ulla, and has three siblings who have competed in the sport—Bela, Bettina, and Benjam. Her American-born father is of Hungarian descent and had moved to Finland when he was five years old.

Career
Papp won the Finnish national junior title in the 2009–10 season and was assigned to the 2010 World Junior Championships in The Hague, Netherlands. Ranked 20th in the short program, she qualified for the free skate where she placed 14th, pulling her up to 15th overall. The following season, she made her senior international debut, at the NRW Trophy in December 2010. She also competed on the senior level at the Finnish Championships, winning silver behind Kiira Korpi.

Papp debuted on the ISU Junior Grand Prix series in September 2011, finishing seventh in Brisbane, Australia and tenth in Innsbruck, Austria. She trained in Burnaby, British Columbia under Joanne McLeod until the end of the 2011–12 season. In the summer of 2012, she relocated to Toronto, Ontario, where she was coached by Brian Orser. After moving back to British Columbia, she joined Bruno Delmaestro and Kelly Champagne, who coach her in Coquitlam.

Papp announced her retirement from competitive skating on October 24, 2015.

Programs

Competitive highlights 
CS: Challenger Series (began in the 2014–15 season); JGP: Junior Grand Prix

References

External links 

 

1995 births
Finnish female single skaters
Living people
People from Kuopio
Finnish expatriate sportspeople in Canada
Finnish people of American descent
Finnish people of Hungarian descent
Competitors at the 2015 Winter Universiade
Sportspeople from North Savo
21st-century Finnish women